Netanya Sapir railway station (Taḥanat HaRakevet Netanya Sapir) is an Israel Railways station located in the Sapir (more commonly known as Poleg) commercial/industrial zone in southern Netanya, on the North-South coastal line.

Station layout
Platform numbers increase in an East-to-West direction

Ridership

References

External links
 The station's page on Israel Railways website

Railway stations in Central District (Israel)
Netanya